Yerofeyevskaya is a rural locality (a village) in Kumzerskoye Rural Settlement, Kharovsky District, Vologda Oblast, Russia. The population was 14 as of 2002.

Geography 
Yerofeyevskaya is located 51 km northwest of Kharovsk (the district's administrative centre) by road. Danilovskaya is the nearest rural locality.

References 

Rural localities in Kharovsky District